Emil Fischer (June 13, 1838 - August 11, 1914), was a famous German dramatic bass or bass-baritone, born in Brunswick. His parents were Friedrich and Caroline Fischer-Achten, both opera singers.

He made his début in 1857 in Graz in Boieldieu's Jean de Paris. After that he filled various engagements in  Pressburg, Stettin, and Brunswick.  From 1863 to 1870, he was director of the opera at Danzig.

From 1875 to 1880, Fischer sang in Rotterdam, and from 1880-85 in Dresden. The period from 1885 to 1891 at the  Metropolitan Opera House, New York, marks the culmination of his artistic triumphs.  Lilli Lehmann, Max Alvary, and Marianne Brandt performed there with him. More than only creating the bass roles in Wagner's later music dramas, as far as America is concerned, he firmly established his reputation as a Wagner interpreter equalled by very few. During 1895-1897, he performed in several American cities as a member of Mr. Damrosch's German Damrosch Opera Company.  He appeared once more, and for the last time, at the Metropolitan Opera House in 1907. Fischer died in Hamburg at the beginning of World War I. He left no known recordings of his voice.

References

 

1838 births
1914 deaths
German operatic basses
Musicians from Braunschweig
People from the Duchy of Brunswick
19th-century German male opera singers